Charlize is a feminine given name. Notable people with the name include:

Charlize Theron (born 1975), South African-American actress and producer
Charlize van der Westhuizen (born 1984), South African cricketer

See also
Charlise Mutten

Feminine given names